The 2020–21 Biathlon World Cup – Mass start Men started on 20 December 2020 in Hochfilzen and will finished on 21 March 2021 in Östersund

Competition format
In the mass start, all biathletes start at the same time and the first across the finish line wins. In this  competition, the distance is skied over five laps; there are four bouts of shooting (two prone and two standing, in that order) with the first shooting bout being at the lane corresponding to the competitor's bib number (bib #10 shoots at lane #10 regardless of position in race), with the rest of the shooting bouts being on a first-come, first-served basis (if a competitor arrives at the lane in fifth place, they shoot at lane 5). As in the sprint and pursuit, competitors must ski one  penalty loop for each miss. Here again, to avoid unwanted congestion, World Cup Mass starts are held with only the 30 top ranking athletes on the start line (half that of the pursuit) as here all contestants start simultaneously.

2019–20 Top 3 standings

Medal winners

Standings
4 of 5 competitions scored

References

Mass start Men